Marcello Bacciarelli (16 February 1731 – 5 January 1818) was a Polish-Italian painter of the late-baroque and Neoclassic periods.

Biography
He was born in Rome, and studied there under Marco Benefial. In 1750, with the recommendation of the architect Gaetano Chiaveri, Marcello was recruited to Dresden in Saxony, where he was employed by Elected King Augustus III of Poland. After the death of King Augustus, Marcello went to Vienna, and thence to Warsaw. In Dresden, he met Bernardo Bellotto and worked with this Italian painter throughout his life. He was recruited by King Stanisław II Augustus in 1766 to become the Director of the newly founded Royal Buildings and Estates.

In Dresden, he married Friederike Richter, a woman painter known for miniature portraits.
In Vienna, Marcello painted portraits of the imperial family, including the four daughters of Maria Teresa, Maria Christina, Duchess of Teschen and her husband, prince Albert. In Warsaw, he painted a set of portraits depicting nearly all Polish kings, from Bolesław I the Brave to the last king of the Polish–Lithuanian Commonwealth, Stanisław II Augustus who was also Bacciarelli's patron and admirer. He also made a portrait of Izabela Lubomirska in her wedding gown, that she commissioned years later after her marriage. Bacciarelli was also keen in painting culturally significant scenes from the history of Poland. Following the partitions of Poland and after Napoleon's rise to power he moved to the Duchy of Warsaw, a client state of the First French Empire and died in 1818.

A number of his paintings were painted for King Stanisław II Augustus of Poland and are in the Royal Castle in Warsaw. These include:
 Strength, Reason, Belief, and Justice, in the Old Audience Chamber
 The Flourishing of the Arts, Sciences, Agriculture, and Trade on the ceiling of the Old Audience Chamber
 Rebecca and Eleazar in the King's Bedroom
 Esther and Ahasuerus in the King's Bedroom

During Bacciarelli's early years in Warsaw, the young Alexander Kucharsky began to train as a painter in his studio. Another notable pupil of Bacciarelli's was Kazimierz Wojniakowski.

Gallery

References 

 

1731 births
1818 deaths
18th-century Polish–Lithuanian painters
18th-century male artists
19th-century Polish painters
19th-century Italian male artists
18th-century Italian painters
Italian male painters
19th-century Italian painters
Court painters of Polish kings
Polish people of Italian descent
Burials at St. John's Archcathedral, Warsaw
Painters from Rome
Polish male painters
Polish courtiers
18th-century Italian male artists